Archana Venkataraman (born 30 August 1988) is an Indian former professional tennis player.

Venkataraman has career-high WTA rankings of 549 in singles, achieved on 18 December 2000, and 510 in doubles, set on 13 November 2006. In her career, she won three singles and six doubles titles on the ITF Women's Circuit.

In 2006, her only WTA Tour main-draw appearance came at the Kolkata where she partnered with fellow Indian Ragini Vimal in the doubles event. But they lost in the first round to South African Liezel Huber and İndian Sania Mirza.

ITF Circuit finals

Singles: 7 (3–4)

Doubles: 20 (6–14)

References

External links
 
 

1988 births
Living people
Indian female tennis players